Blue Lake is a small lake at the foot of the Tasman Glacier in inland Canterbury, in the central South Island of New Zealand. Its outflow is the Tasman River, part of the Waitaki River system.

Lakes of Canterbury, New Zealand